Events in the year 2020 in Liberia.

Incumbents 

 President: George Weah
 Vice President: Jewel Taylor
 Chief Justice: Francis S. Korkpor, Sr.

Events 

March 16 – The first case of COVID-19 in the country was confirmed. The person, a government official, had traveled from Switzerland.
April 4 – The first COVID-19 death in the country is reported.
April 8 – President George Weah declared lock-down measures to take effect on April 10 and last for 3 weeks, including suspension of all non-essential travel and curfews. Schools were closed across the country, and churches, mosques, bars, and beaches in parts of the country.
December 8
2020 Liberian constitutional referendum: Voters must decide on two Constitutional amendments: one to shorten the President's term in office, and the other to reverse the ban on dual nationality.
2020 Liberian Senate election
December 28
The Collaborating Political Parties (CPP) calls for a rerun of the election in the Nimba County Senatorial Election.
The United States extends the Liberian Refugee Immigration Fairness program (LRIF) until December 20, 2021.

Deaths
 June 21 
Bill Horace, former warlord, shot in London, Ontario, Canada
Joseph Korto, Minister of Education (2006-2010), in Delaware, United States
 July 1 – J. Nagbe Sloh, member of the House of Representatives of Liberia, in Monrovia
 July 8 – Munah Pelham-Youngblood, member of the House of Representatives of Liberia, in Accra, Ghana (b. 1983)
 September 16 – Chea Cheapoo, Chief Justice (1987), in New Georgia (b. 1942)
 April 4 – George Dweh, politician and warlord, Speaker of the National Transitional Legislative Assembly of Liberia (2003–2005) (b. 1961)

See also
COVID-19 pandemic in Africa
COVID-19 pandemic in Liberia

References 

 
2020s in Liberia
Years of the 21st century in Liberia
Liberia
Liberia